Mapuranam was a grammar book in Tamil language which was considered authoritative during the second Sangam period.

References

Tamil language
Tamil-language literature
Ancient Tamil Nadu